Wila Qullu (Aymara wila blood, blood-red, qullu mountain, "red mountain", also spelled Wila Khollu, Wila Kkollu) is a mountain in the Bolivian Andes which reaches a height of approximately . It is located in the Cochabamba Department, Ayopaya Province, Ayopaya Municipality. Wila Qullu lies southeast of the village of Juch'uy Wila Jaqhi (Quechua-Aymara for "little red rock", also spelled Juchuy Wila Jakke or Vilayaque Chico).

References 

Mountains of Cochabamba Department